Hamer House may refer to:

 Edward Hamer House, Vermont, Illinois, listed on the NRHP in Fulton County, Illinois
 Patterson Hamer House, Vermont, Illinois, listed on the NRHP in Fulton County, Illinois
 James W. Hamer House, Little Rock, South Carolina, NRHP-listed

See also
Hamer Hall (disambiguation)
Hamer's General Store, Mechanicsburg, Ohio, listed on the NRHP in Champaign County, Ohio